The 2008 AFF U-19 Youth Championship took place from 5 October to 11 October 2008 in Bangkok, Thailand.  This is the first edition of tournament as an under-19 competition as it was previously for players under-20.  Only four nations participated, two from the ASEAN region and two invitee teams.

Teams

Tournament 
All times are Thailand Standard Time (TST) - UTC+7

Group stage

Third place play-off

Final

Winner

Award

Goalscorers 

3 goals:
  Nirunrit Jaroensuk
2 goals:
  Miloš Lujič
  Mitch Nichols
  Tan Yang
1 goal:
  Nathan Elasi
  Choi Jung-Han
  An Jung-Hun
  Piao Cheng
  Yu Yang
  Kroekrit Thaweekarn

See also 
AFC U-19 Championship

External links 
"AFF U-19 Youth Championship 2008" ASEAN Football Federation.

 

3
2008 in Thai football
2008
2008
2008 in youth association football